The 9th Assembly District of Wisconsin is one of 99 districts in the Wisconsin State Assembly.  Located in southeast Wisconsin, the district is entirely contained within Milwaukee County.  It comprises part of the city of Milwaukee's south side, including the Layton Park neighborhood, Southgate, and Polonia.  The district also contains the Mitchell Park Domes and the historic Forest Home Cemetery.  The district is represented by Democrat Marisabel Cabrera, since January 2019.

The 9th Assembly district is located within Wisconsin's 3rd Senate district, along with the 7th and 8th Assembly districts.

List of past representatives

References 

Wisconsin State Assembly districts
Milwaukee County, Wisconsin